NGCA may refer to:
 Northern Gallery for Contemporary Art, contemporary art gallery which is based in Sunderland, England
 Women's Golf Coaches Association, formerly known as the National Golf Coaches Association